Attila Cornelius Zoller (June 13, 1927  – January 25, 1998) was a Hungarian jazz guitarist. After World War II, he escaped the Soviet takeover of Hungary by fleeing through the mountains on foot into Austria. In 1959, he moved to the U.S., where he spent the rest of his life as a musician and teacher.

Music career

Zoller was born in Visegrád, Hungary. As a child, he learned violin from his father, a professional violinist. While in school, he played flugelhorn and bass before choosing guitar. He dropped out of school and played in jazz clubs in Budapest while Russia occupied Hungary. He fled Hungary in 1948 as the Soviet Union was establishing communist military rule. He escaped on foot, carrying his guitar through the mountains into Austria. He settled in Vienna, became an Austrian citizen, and started a jazz group with accordionist Vera Auer.

In the mid-1950s, Zoller moved to Germany and played with German musicians Jutta Hipp and Hans Koller. When American jazz musicians passed through, such as Oscar Pettiford and Lee Konitz, they persuaded him to move to the United States. He moved to the U.S. after receiving a scholarship to the Lenox School of Jazz. One of his teachers was guitarist Jim Hall and his roommate was Ornette Coleman, who got him interested in free jazz.

From 1962–1965, Zoller performed in a group with flautist Herbie Mann, then Lee Konitz and Albert Mangelsdorff. Over the years, he played and recorded with Benny Goodman, Stan Getz, Red Norvo, Jimmy Raney, Herbie Hancock, Ron Carter, Shirley Scott, Cal Tjader, Jimi Hendrix, and in New York City jazz clubs in the 1960s with pianist Don Friedman

In 1974, he started the Attila Zoller Jazz Clinics in Vermont, later named the Vermont Jazz Center, where he taught until 1998. He invented a bi-directional pickup, designed strings and a signature guitar series. Between the years 1989 and 1998, he played more and more with the German vibraphonist Wolfgang Lackerschmid. They also did recordings together. He performed with Tommy Flanagan and George Mraz in New York City three weeks before his death in 1998 in Townshend, Vermont.

Awards and honors
 Lifetime Achievement Award, New England Foundation for the Arts
 Message to Attila, tribute album, coordinated and produced by guitarist David Becker, featuring Zoller's compositions performed by guitarists John Abercrombie, Gene Bertoncini, Peter Bernstein, Pat Metheny, and Mike Stern

Discography

As leader
 The Horizon Beyond (Emarcy, 1965)
 Zoller Koller Solal with Hans Koller & Martial Solal (SABA, 1966)
 Katz & Maus (SABA, 1967)
 Zo-Ko-Ma with Lee Konitz & Albert Mangelsdorff (MPS, 1968)
 Gypsy Cry (Embryo, 1970)
 Dream Bells (Enja, 1976)
 Common Cause (Enja, 1979)
 The K & K 3 in New York with Hans Koller & George Mraz (L+R, 1980)
 Jim & I  with Jimmy Raney (L+R, 1980)
 Jim & I Live  with Jimmy Raney (L+R, 1981)
 Conjunction (Inner City, 1981)
 Jim & I Live at Quasimodo with Jimmy Raney (L+R, 1986)
 Memories of Pannonia (Enja, 1986)
 Overcome (Enja, 1988)
 Live Highlights '92 (Bhakti, 1992)
 When It's Time (Enja, 1995)
 Lasting Love (Acoustic Music Records, 1997)
 The Last Recordings (Enja, 2000)
 Common Language (Acoustic Music Records, 2002)
 Jazz Soundtracks (Sonorama, 2013)

As sideman
With Albert Mangelsdorff
 Albert Mangelsdorff and His Friends (MPS, 1977)
 Mainhattan Modern Lost Jazz Files (Sonorama, 2015)
 The Jazz Sextet (Moosicus, 2017)

With Herbie Mann
 Herbie Mann Live at Newport (Atlantic, 1963)
 My Kinda Groove (Atlantic, 1965)
 Our Mann Flute (Atlantic, 1966)
 Impressions of the Middle East (Atlantic, 1967)
 The Beat Goes On (Atlantic, 1967)

With others
 Gary Crosby, Gary Crosby (World Pacific, 1957)
 Klaus Doldinger, Doldinger in Sud Amerika (Philips, 1965)
 Klaus Doldinger, Jubilee (Atlantic, 1973)
 Lajos Dudas, Monte Carlo (Rayna, 1981)
 Don Friedman, Dreams and Explorations (Riverside, 1965)
 Don Friedman, Metamorphosis (Prestige, 1966)
 Hans Koller, Exclusiv (SABA, 1963)
 Hans Koller, Trinity (L+R, 1979)
 Lee Konitz & Don Friedman & Attila Zoller, Thingin (hat ART, 1996)
 Emil Mangelsdorff, Meditation (L+R, 1994)
 Oscar Pettiford, The Oscar Pettiford Quartet (Ex Libris, 1958)
 Oscar Pettiford, The Legendary Oscar Pettiford (Black Lion, 1975)
 Dave Pike, Manhattan Latin (Decca, 1964)
 Shirley Scott, Roll 'Em: Shirley Scott Plays the Big Bands (Impulse!, 1966)
 Tony Scott, Tony Scott (Verve, 1968)
 Cal Tjader, Soul Burst (Verve, 1966)
 Michal Urbaniak, We'll Remember Komeda (MPS/BASF, 1973)

Bibliography 
 Simon Géza Gábor: Mindhalálig gitár - Zoller Attila élete és művészete. Budapest, 2002. 
 Géza Gábor Simon: Immens gut, Attila Zoller. Sein Leben und seine Kunst. Budapest 2003. 
 Heinz Protzer: Attila Zoller. Sein Leben, seine Zeit, seine Musik. Erftstadt 2009. 
 Géza Gábor Simon: Guitar Forever - Attila Zoller Discography, Budapest 2011

References

External links
 Attila Zoller discography at JazzDiscography.com
 Vermont Jazz Center on Zoller

1927 births
1998 deaths
Enja Records artists
ACT Music artists
Free jazz guitarists
Hungarian jazz guitarists
Male jazz musicians
Male guitarists
20th-century guitarists
Black Lion Records artists
Hungarian male musicians